Whites Creek may refer to:

Whites Creek (Brazil Creek), a stream in Missouri
Whites Creek (Eleven Point River), a stream in Missouri
Whites Creek (Hunter Creek), a stream in Missouri
Whites Creek, Tennessee, an unincorporated community
Whites Creek Historic District NRHP listed district in Nashville, Tennessee 
Whites Creek (West Virginia), a stream
Whites Creek (Annandale), a stream in Australia
Whites Creek High School, Nashville, Tennessee

See also
White Creek (disambiguation)